Podlesny is a rural locality (a settlement) in Sevsky District, Bryansk Oblast, Russia. The population was 6 as of 2010.

Geography 
Podlesny is located 25 km southwest of Sevsk (the district's administrative centre) by road. Voskresenovka is the nearest rural locality.

References 

Rural localities in Sevsky District